Mount Jefferson is a common name for mountains in the United States, usually referring to Thomas Jefferson, the country's third president. The mountains include:

peaks